Benedetti's Pizza is a pizza chain in Mexico. Founded in 1983, it currently operates more than 114 units in 16 cities of the Mexican Republic and its headquarters are in Mexico City. For the year 2022, the company plans to open 12 new pizzerias in Mexico City and Monterrey, a new market for them.

References

External links
Official site (Spanish)

Restaurants established in 1983
Pizza chains
Restaurants in Mexico
Pizza franchises
Mexican companies established in 1983